ESSA-4 (or TOS-B) was a spin-stabilized operational meteorological satellite. Its name was derived from that of its oversight agency, the Environmental Science Services Administration (ESSA).

Background 
ESSA 4 was launched to replace ESSA 2, launched February 3, 1966, which had drifted into an orbit of limited usefulness. The satellite was financed, managed, and operated by the Environmental Science Services Administration (ESSA).

Spacecraft 
The  cartwheel-shaped spacecraft carried two Automatic Picture Transmission (APT) systems, with which it could instantly transmit photos of Earth's cloudcover to APT ground stations.

Launch 
ESSA-4 was launched on January 26, 1967, at 17:31 UTC. It was launched atop a Delta rocket from Vandenberg Space Launch Complex 2, into Sun-synchronous orbit. ESSA-4 had an inclination of 102°, and an orbited the earth once every 113.4 minutes.

The satellite properly aligned itself with respect to the Earth during its 18th orbit, whereupon its first photos were transmitted. A two-week spacecraft checkout and evaluation program ensued. One of the APTs failed after launch, but the other performed normally.

Legacy and status 

ESSA 4 was turned operationally off on December 6, 1967, being finally deactivated on May 5, 1968.

References

Spacecraft launched in 1967
Weather satellites of the United States